A Florida Feud is a 1909 American silent film produced by Kalem Company and directed by Sidney Olcott, shot in Florida.

Production notes
The film was shot in Jacksonville, Florida. The first  of a series shot for Kalem during winter and spring.

Other title : Love in the Everglades

Bibliography
 The Moving Picture World, Vol 4 n° 1, p 11.
 The New York Dramatic Mirror, January 9, 1909, p 9 ; January 16, 1909, p 7.

References

External links

 A Florida Feud website dedicated to Sidney Olcott

1909 films
1909 drama films
1909 short films
American black-and-white films
American silent short films
Films directed by Sidney Olcott
Films set in Florida
Films shot in Jacksonville, Florida
Silent American drama films
1900s American films